A homestead (Xhosa: umzi) in southern Africa is a cluster of several houses, typically occupied by a single extended family and often with an attached kraal. Such settlements are characteristic of Nguni-speaking peoples. A house within a homestead is known as an indlu, plural tindlu (Swati) or izindlu (Xhosa and Zulu).

See also
Compound (enclosure)
Boma (enclosure)

Society of South Africa
Human habitats
Nguni